The red-capped plover (Charadrius ruficapillus), also known as the red-capped dotterel, is a small species of plover.

It breeds in Australia. This species is closely related to (and sometimes considered conspecific with) the Kentish plover, Javan plover, and white-fronted plover.

Description
Red-capped plovers have a white forehead and underparts. Their upperparts are mainly grey-brown. Adult males have a rufous or reddish-brown crown and hindneck. Adult females have a paler rufous and grey-brown crown and hindneck, with a pale loreal stripe. The upperwing of Charadrius ruficapillus shows dark brown remiges (flight feathers) and primary covert feathers with a white wingbar in flight. Its length is 14–16 cm (5.5–6.3 in) and its wingspan is 27–34 cm (10.6–13.4 in); it weighs 35–40 g (1.2–1.4 oz).

Breeding plumage shows a red-brown crown and nape with black margins. Non-breeding plumage is duller and lacks the black margins.

Distribution and habitat

The red-capped plover is widespread in Australia; it is a vagrant to New Zealand, although it bred there for some time in small numbers from 1950–1980. The species occupies a range of coastal and inland habitats, including estuaries, bays, beaches, sandflats, and mudflats; inland saline wetlands. It is also found in inland wetland areas with bare ground.

Food

The red-capped plover feeds mostly on small invertebrates, especially molluscs, crustaceans, and worms.

Breeding

The red-capped plover is a seasonal breeder on the coasts of Australia, but breeds in response to unpredictable rains inland. The plover nests on the ground close to wetlands; the nest is a small depression in the ground, with minimal or no lining. The clutch of two pale yellowish-brown eggs are speckled with black spots. The Incubation period is 30 days; incubating is mainly done by the female. Upon hatching, the young are open-eyed, mobile, and relatively mature (precocial); they flee the nest shortly after birth (nidifugous).

Conservation
With a large range and no evidence of significant population decline, this species' conservation status is of Least Concern.

References

BirdLife International. (2006). Species factsheet: Charadrius ruficapillus. Downloaded from http://www.birdlife.org on 12 February 2007
Marchant, S.; Higgins, P.J.; & Davies, J.N. (eds). (1994). Handbook of Australian, New Zealand and Antarctic Birds.  Volume 2: Raptors to Lapwings. Oxford University Press: Melbourne.

External links

red-capped-plover
Birds of Australia
Birds of Timor
red-capped plover
Articles containing video clips
Taxa named by Coenraad Jacob Temminck